Gwiazdy (Polish for "Stars") is a Polish coat of arms. It was used by a number of szlachta (noble) families under the Polish–Lithuanian Commonwealth.

History

Blazon
Azure in fess three mullets-of-six-points or.  The Helm mantled azure doubled or, crested [what is that?].

Notable bearers
Notable bearers of this coat of arms have included:

See also
 Polish heraldry
 Heraldry
 Coat of arms

Polish coats of arms